KTAT (1570 AM) is a radio station licensed to Frederick, Oklahoma, United States. The format is adult standards. The station is currently owned by High Plains Radio Network, LLC.

History 
On January 25, 2006 the station was sold to Morey Broadcasting.

References

External links

TAT